A sign of contradiction, in Catholic theology, is someone who, upon manifesting holiness, is subject to extreme opposition. The term is from the biblical phrase "sign that is spoken against", found in Luke 2:34 and in Acts 28:22, which refer to Jesus Christ and the early Christians.

According to Catholic tradition, a sign of contradiction points to the presence of Christ or the presence of the divine due to the union of that person or reality with God. In his book, Sign of Contradiction, Pope John Paul II says that "sign of contradiction" might be "a distinctive definition of Christ and of his Church."

The cross and mortification as signs of contradiction

Edith Stein, called the Patron of Europe by Pope John Paul II, once taught on the day of the Feast of the Exaltation of the Holy Cross, September 14, 1939:

Views on the cross creates a division: "The division between those whose first love is God, and those whose first love is self – might also be expressed as the division between those who accept the place of the Cross in the following of Christ, and those who reject all sacrifice except it be for personal gain."

The Church and Christians as signs of contradiction

The second biblical phrase is from Acts 28:22, quoting a Jew in Rome with whom Paul was talking:

According to Catholic theologians and ecclesiologists like Charles Journet and Kenneth D. Whitehead in One, Holy, Catholic, and Apostolic: The Early Church was the Catholic Church, the sect being referred to here by the Jews is the early church of Christians.

The Church and the early Christians, according to these Catholic theologians, are one with Jesus Christ. As an example, they say that when Paul was persecuting the early Church, Jesus Christ appeared to him and said: "Why do you persecute me?"

The passage from the Acts of the Apostles is related to John 15:5–8:

This passage shows the double-movement depending on the two possible attitudes towards Christ: whoever is united to Christ in holiness will rise and bear fruit, while those who are disunited to Christ will fall down and wither.

Pope John Paul II

A contemporary example seen by many as of a sign of contradiction is Pope John Paul II. His defense of life and the human embryo through unprecedented infallible teachings on abortion, euthanasia, and murder as grave sins in the Encyclical , was seen as a sign of contradiction.

Catholic martyrs of the 20th century

Writing for Catholic Herald, Robert Royal, president of the Faith and Reason Institute, reported about the results of his research which appeared in his book The Catholic Martyrs of the Twentieth Century: A Comprehensive Global History.

Human beings as signs of contradiction

Elio Sgreccia, Vice President of the Pontifical Council for Life, said in an article entitled "The Embryo: A Sign of Contradiction":

Sign of Contradiction by Pope John Paul II

Sign of Contradiction is also the title of Lenten meditations preached by and written about upon the request of Pope Paul VI by Pope John Paul II. The theme of the book, according to one review, is "the human encounter with God in a world that seems to contradict the reality of divine power and love." Pope John Paul II says in his conclusion that "It is becoming more and more evident that those words (Luke 2:34) sum up most felicitously the whole truth about Jesus Christ, his mission and his Church."

See also
Foolishness for Christ
Hermit
Stylite

Endnotes

References

Wojtyla, Karol. Sign of Contradiction.
Woods, Thomas. How the Catholic Church Built Western Civilization.
Quasten, James. Patrology.
Carrol, Warren. History of Christendom.
Journet, Charles. The Church.
Allen, John. Opus Dei: An Objective Look at the Most Controversial Force in the Catholic Church.
Casciaro, Josemaria, et al. Navarre Bible.
José Miguel Cejas, Piedras de escandalo

Catholicism-related controversies
Catholic theology and doctrine